Charles "Chic" Geatons (16 July 1907 – 20 July 1970) was a Scottish footballer who played for Celtic, his only club as a professional. He was a Scottish Football League winner twice (1935–36 and 1937–38), and a Scottish Cup winner three times (1931, 1933 and 1937).

He retired as a player in 1941 but returned to the club in 1945 as a coach. Geatons left Celtic in 1950, citing frustration at the club chairman's excessive involvement in team matters.

References

External links
Chic Geatons, The Celtic Wiki

1907 births
1970 deaths
Scottish footballers
Association football forwards
Celtic F.C. players
Celtic F.C. non-playing staff
Scottish Football League players
Scottish Junior Football Association players
Scottish Football League representative players
People from Lochgelly
Footballers from Fife
Association football wing halves